Palpita jansei is a moth in the family Crambidae. It was described by Eugene G. Munroe in 1977. It is found in Papua New Guinea.

References

Moths described in 1977
Palpita
Moths of New Guinea